When Two Worlds Collide is the 36th studio album by Jerry Lee Lewis, released on Elektra Records in 1980.

Background
When Two Worlds Collide was Lewis's second album after leaving Mercury Records and peaked at number 32 on the Billboard country albums chart. The title track was released as a single, making it to number 11, while the Jerry Chestnut song "Honky Tonk Stuff" reached number 28. Lewis had previously recorded "Who Will Buy the Wine" with Sam Phillips at Sun Records. The period leading up to the recording had been a difficult one for Lewis.  In July 1979, his father died of cancer and, two months later, he was arrested for possession of pills prescribed by Dr. George C. Nichopoulos, the infamous "Dr. Nick" who had also prescribed pills to Elvis Presley. (In the 2014 authorized biography Jerry Lee Lewis: His Own Story, Lewis would call Dr. Nick "a good man, a remarkable man.") The IRS was also after his assets and he was in poor health from a lifetime of excess.  He went on an ill-advised British tour, appearing on The Old Grey Whistle Test, and then came home to participate in a television special with Mickey Gilley called A Family Affair, looking gaunt as the cousins played side by side at the piano.

Track listing
"Rockin' Jerry Lee" (Jerry Lee Lewis) - 2:35
"Who Will Buy the Wine" (Billy Mize) - 2:54
"Love Game" (Hugh Moffatt) - 3:30
"Alabama Jubilee" (George Cobb, Jack Yellen) - 4:45
"Good Time Charlie's Got the Blues" (Danny O'Keefe) - 2:22
"When Two Worlds Collide" (Bill Anderson, Roger Miller) - 2:27
"Good News Travels Fast" (Rick Klang) - 2:49
"I Only Want a Buddy Not a Sweetheart" (Edward H. Jones) - 3:40
"Honky Tonk Stuff" (Jerry Chesnut) - 2:57
"Toot, Toot, Tootsie, Goodbye" (Ernie Erdman, Ted Fiorito, Gus Kahn) - 3:53

Personnel
Jerry Lee Lewis - vocals, piano
David Kirby, Duke Faglier - guitar
Kenny Lovelace - guitar, fiddle
Bobby Thompson - acoustic guitar, banjo
Steve Chapman - acoustic guitar
Stu Basore - steel guitar
Bobby Dyson - bass
Bunky Keels - electric piano, organ
Jimmy Isbell - drums, percussion
George Tidwell, Ron Keller - trumpet
Dennis Good - trombone
Denis Solee - clarinet
The Lea Jane Singers - backing vocals
The Shelly Kurland String Section - strings
Billy Strange - string arrangements

1980 albums
Jerry Lee Lewis albums
Albums arranged by Billy Strange
Elektra Records albums